Les Barley (born in Gretna, Virginia) is a former NFL, CFL and Arena Football League fullback and linebacker. In a career lasting ten years, he played for the Charlotte Rage, the Connecticut Coyotes, the Tampa Bay Storm, the Grand Rapids Rampage and the Milwaukee Mustangs. He is a Hall Of Fame linebacker at Winston-Salem State University. He was named First Team All-Arena in 1995 and Second Team All-Arena in 1998.

External links
Les Barley at ArenaFan Online

1967 births
Living people
People from Gretna, Virginia
American football linebackers
American football fullbacks
Winston-Salem State Rams football players
Charlotte Rage players
Connecticut Coyotes players
Tampa Bay Storm players
Grand Rapids Rampage players
Milwaukee Mustangs (1994–2001) players